The Moore Covered Bridge was northeast of Judson, Indiana. The single-span Burr Arch covered bridge structure was built by the Joseph A. Britton in 1909 and destroyed by flood in 1957.

History

Construction
Joseph A. Britton built this bridge the same year that he built the Phillips Covered Bridge. The location listed is an estimate of where the bridge was actually located. It appears from comparing modern satellite photos to an old Parke County Atlas the location of the bridge may be flooded by a lake now.

Destruction
In 1957, when this bridge and the Weisner Covered Bridge were both destroyed in the same flood, the idea for a Parke County Covered Bridge Festival was born.

See also
 Parke County Covered Bridges

References

Former covered bridges in Parke County, Indiana
Bridges completed in 1909
Wooden bridges in Indiana
Burr Truss bridges in the United States